Frank Ticheli  (born January 21, 1958) is an American composer of orchestral, choral, chamber, and concert band works. He lives in Los Angeles, California, where he is a Professor of Composition at the University of Southern California. He was the Pacific Symphony's composer-in-residence from 1991 to 1998, composing numerous works for that orchestra. A number of his works are particularly notable, as they have become standards in concert band repertoire.

Biography
Ticheli was born in Monroe, Louisiana. He graduated from L.V. Berkner High School in Richardson, Texas and earned a Doctor of Musical Arts as well as a Masters Degrees in Composition from the University of Michigan, and a Bachelor of Music in Composition from Southern Methodist University, where he studied with Donald Erb and Jack Waldenmaier. He went on to receive his master's and doctoral degrees in composition from the University of Michigan, where he studied with William Albright, Leslie Bassett, George Wilson, and William Bolcom.

Subsequently, Ticheli was an Assistant Professor of Music at Trinity University in San Antonio, Texas. There, he served on the board of directors of the Texas Composers Forum and was a member of the advisory committee for the San Antonio Symphony's "Music of the Americas" project. From 1991 to 1998, Ticheli was composer-in-residence with the Pacific Symphony Orchestra in Orange County, California. Since 1991, he has been a Professor of Composition at the University of Southern California's Thornton School of Music. In 2011, he endowed the "Frank Ticheli Composition Scholarship" to be awarded each year to an incoming graduate student in composition.

Recent works include The Shore (Symphony No. 3) a 35-minute work for chorus and orchestra, with its East Coast premiere given by New York Choral Society and Orchestra at New York's Carnegie Hall; three new concertos (for flute, clarinet, and alto saxophone); and Songs of Love and Life, for soprano soloist and 18 players, composed for the conductor, Allan McMurray.

Awards and grants
Ticheli has been the recipient of numerous awards, including the Arts and Letters Award, Goddard Lieberson Fellowship, and Charles Ives Scholarship, all from the American Academy of Arts and Letters, the National Band Association/Revelli Memorial Prize, the A. Austin Harding Award, the Distinguished Service to Music Medal, and First Prize in the Texas Sesquicentennial Orchestral Composition Competition, the Britten-on-the-Bay Choral Composition Contest, and the Virginia CBDNA Symposium for New Band Music. In addition to these awards, Ticheli has been named a national honorary member of Phi Mu Alpha Sinfonia and Kappa Kappa Psi.

Grants and commissions for Ticheli's works have come from Chamber Music America, the American Music Center, Pacific Symphony, Pacific Chorale, Worldwide Concurrent Premieres, Inc., Prince George's Philharmonic Orchestra, Adrian Symphony, City of San Antonio, Stephen F. Austin State University, University of Michigan, Trinity University, and the Indiana Bandmasters Association, and many others. His work, Angels in the Architecture, for concert band with soprano soloist, was commissioned by Kingsway International and received its premiere performance in July 2008 by a massed band of young musicians from Australia and the U.S. at the Sydney Opera House.

Works

Ticheli's works are published by Manhattan Beach Music, Encore Music Publishers, and Hinshaw Music, and are recorded on the labels of Albany, Chandos, Clarion, Delos, Equilibrium, Klavier, Koch International Classics, Mark, Naxos, Reference, and others. They include the following:

For orchestra

 All the World's a Stage, for audience and orchestra (2020)
 Rest, for string orchestra (2012)
 Riffs for Steven (2010)
 Angels in the Architecture (2009)
 An American Elegy (2008)
 Shooting Stars (2004)
 Symphony No. 1 (2001)
 Blue Shades (1997)
 Radiant Voices (1993)
 On Time's Stream (1995)
 Postcard (1995)
 Pacific Fanfare (1995)
 Images of a Storm (1983)

For solo with orchestra
 Concerto for Clarinet and Orchestra (2011)
 Symphony No. 1 (solo tenor or baritone in mvt. 4 only) (2001)
 An American Dream (with solo soprano) (1998)
 Playing With Fire (for seven-piece jazz band and orchestra) (1992)
 Concerto for Trumpet and Orchestra (1990)

For chorus and orchestra
 Sailing the Sky (2021)
 The Shore, a choral symphony on four poems of David St. John (2013)

For chorus
 Until Forever Fades Away, for chorus and strings (2020)
 Lux Aeterna (2018)
 Here Take this Lovely Flower (2012)
 Constellation: Three Poems of Sara Teasdale (2010)
 Earth Song (2007)
 The Song Within (2004)
 There Will Be Rest (2000)

For wind ensembleOver the Moon (2022)BASH (2021)Life-Stream (2021)Sailing the Sky (2021)Lux Perpetua (2020)Silver Lining, Concerto for Flute and Wind Ensemble (2017)Serenade for Kristin, for solo oboe and small wind ensemble (2017)Acadiana (2017)Dancing on Water (2015)December Snow (2015)
 Concerto for Alto Saxophone and Wind Ensemble (2014)Earth Song (2014)
 Korean Folksongs from Jeju Island (2013)
 First Light (2013)
 Songs of Love and Life, for soprano and 18 players (2012)
 Concerto for Clarinet and Concert Band (2011)
 San Antonio Dances (2011)
 Rest (2011)
 Amen! (2009)
 Angels in the Architecture (2009)
 The Tyger (2008)
 Symphony No. 1 (transcribed by Gary Green)
 Wild Nights! (2007)
 Nitro (2006) – commissioned by the Northshore Concert Band
 Sanctuary (2006)
 Abracadabra (2005)
 Joy Revisited (2005)
 Joy (2005)
 Symphony No. 2 (2004) – winner of the 2006 NBA/William D. Revelli Memorial Band Composition Contest
 Ave Maria (2004)
 A Shaker Gift Song (2004)
 Pacific Fanfare (2003)
 Loch Lomond (2002)
 Simple Gifts: Four Shaker Songs (2002)
 An American Elegy (2000)
 Vesuvius (1999)
 Shenandoah (1999)
 Blue Shades (1997)
 Sun Dance (1997)
 Cajun Folk Songs II (1997)
 Postcard (1994)
 Gaian Visions (1994)
 Amazing Grace (1994)
 Cajun Folk Songs (1990)
 Fortress (1989)
 Portrait of a Clown (1998)
 Music for Winds & Percussion (1988)
 Concertino for Trombone and Band (1987)

For chamber ensemble
 Concerto for Clarinet (2011)
 Out of the Blue (2004)
 Songs of Tagore (1992)
 Back Burner (1989)
 Here We Stand (1989)
 Concertino for Trombone (1987)
 The First Voice (1987)
 String Quartet (1986)
 Fantasy (1984)
 Two Songs of Loss (1983)
 Humouresque (1980)
 Poltergeists (1980)
 No Time (1980)
 Three Movements (1979)
 Trio for Brass (1978)

 References 

External links
"An Interview with Frank Ticheli", Band DirectorThe Music of Frank Ticheli, Frank Ticheli's official website by Manhattan Beach Music
Composition Faculty, USC Thornton School of Music's faculty biographies
"Frank_Ticheli", Wind Repertory Project''
Composer's Collection: Frank Ticheli
Maestros in Minivans, Season 1, Episodes 5 and 6: Frank Ticheli
A Composer's Insight, Thoughts, Analysis and Commentary on Contemporary Masterpieces for Wind Band, Edited by Tim Salzman: pp.199-269

1958 births
Living people
Musicians from Dallas
Musicians from Monroe, Louisiana
Southern Methodist University alumni
University of Michigan School of Music, Theatre & Dance alumni
USC Thornton School of Music faculty
Distinguished Service to Music Medal recipients
20th-century classical composers
21st-century classical composers
University of Southern California faculty
21st-century American composers
American male classical composers
American classical composers
20th-century American composers
Classical musicians from Texas
20th-century American male musicians
21st-century American male musicians